This list shows notable events for Darwin, nowadays the capital city of the Northern Territory, Australia. Note: When Darwin was first settled, it was called Palmerston and the port was called Port Darwin. In 1911 the town was renamed Darwin due to the common usage of the name.

19th Century

1870s

1880s

1890s

Twentieth century

1900s

1910s

1920s

1930s

1940s

1950s

1960s

1970s

1980s

1990s

21st century

2000s

2010s

2020s

References

History of Darwin, Northern Territory
Darwinj